is a railway station on the Osaka Metro in Kita-ku, Osaka, Japan.

Lines
Minami-morimachi Station is served by the following two Osaka Municipal Subway lines.

Station layout

Tanimachi Line
There are an island platform and a side platform with two tracks on the second basement level.

The station was originally built with an island platform, but overcrowding prompted construction of a second platform (construction was completed on 10 October 1997). As of 2017, the side platform is used for northbound trains, and the northbound side of the island platform is fenced off.

Sakaisuji Line
There are two side platforms with two tracks on the first basement level.

History
The station opened on 24 March 1967, served by the Tanimachi Line. The Sakaisuji Line platforms opened on 6 December 1969.

Surrounding area
Osaka-Temmangu Station (on the JR Tōzai Line)
Osaka Temmangu Shrine
National Route 1 (Sonezaki-dori)
Osaka Prefectural Route 14 Osaka Takatsuki Kyoto Route (Tenjimbashisuji)
Osaka Prefectural Route 102 Ebisu minami-morimachi Route (Tenjimbashisuji)
Japan Mint
Temma Tenjin Hanjotei
Daiwa Minami-morimachi Building
Tenjimbashisuji Shopping Arcade
Sumitomo Mitsui Banking Corporation
The Yomiuri Shimbun Osaka

See also
 List of railway stations in Japan

External links

 Minami-morimachi Station - Sakaisuji Line from Osaka Metro website 
 Minami-morimachi Station - Sakaisuji Line from Osaka Metro website 
 Minami-morimachi Station - Tanimachi Line from Osaka Metro website 
 Minami-morimachi Station - Tanimachi Line from Osaka Metro website 

Railway stations in Osaka Prefecture
Railway stations in Japan opened in 1967
Osaka Metro stations